Colonel D. Sreeram Kumar AC (born 11 January 1981) is a serving Indian Army officer who was decorated in 2010 with the Ashoka Chakra, India's highest peacetime gallantry decoration.

Early life
Sreeram Kumar was born in Kovilpatti and did his schooling in Sainik School, Amaravathinagar and passed out in 1998. He did his under graduation at The American College in Madurai.

Army career

Kumar joined the Officers Training Academy, Chennai in October 2002 and received a short-service commission in 90 Medium Regiment (Artillery) on 20 March 2004, with the rank of lieutenant. On 20 March 2009, he received a regular commission (seniority from 20 October 2004) with the service number IC-66076A, and was promoted captain on 20 October 2006. Promoted acting major on 24 August 2008, he served with 39 Assam Rifles in Arunachal Pradesh (Operation Orchid) and later in Manipur (Operation Hifazat).

Ashoka Chakra citation
A brief about the action reads:

Subsequent career
Kumar is an instructor at the Indian Military Academy (IMA). He received a substantive promotion to major on 20 October 2010, with promotion to lieutenant-colonel on 20 October 2017. On 31 January 2021, he was promoted to colonel (by selection), with seniority from 26 October 2019.

Controversy
In March 2013, a Supreme Court judicial commission ruled the killing of cousins Gobind and Nobo Meitei in the Langol area of Imphal to have been a staged encounter. The killings took place on 4 April 2009, and involved a joint team of local police and a unit of 39 Assam Rifles commanded by Kumar. While official statements from the paramilitary forces were that the cousins had opened fire when challenged and had been killed in response, the judicial panel concluded that based on medical evidence and witness testimonies, the action was "not an encounter but an operation by the security forces wherein death of the victims was caused knowingly". 

Referring to the encounter, in which 89 rounds were fired at the pair, Kumar was reported as saying the encounter had been genuine, and that his understanding was "when a person is warned by the security forces and if he reacts by firing, such a person is a hardcore terrorist."

On 14 July 2017, the Supreme Court directed the Central Bureau of Investigation (CBI) to conduct a probe into several extrajudicial killings in Manipur, including the case in which Kumar was implicated.

References 

Indian Army officers
People from Tamil Nadu
1981 births
Recipients of the Ashoka Chakra (military decoration)
People from Coimbatore
Living people
Sainik School alumni
Ashoka Chakra